The Tijeras Greenstone is a geologic formation in central New Mexico. It has a radiometric age of 1660 million years (Ma), corresponding to the Statherian period.

History of investigation
The unit was first defined by V.C. Kelley and S.A. Northrop in 1975. The formation was included in the Manzano Group by Mark Holland and coinvestigators in 2020.

Geology
It is a sequence of metavolcanic and metasedimentary beds, typically dark green in color, with its texture varying from unfoliated to strongly schistose. The dominant rock type is metabasalt of tholeiitic composition. The more foliated beds are chlorite or hornblende schist, but much of the formation is igneous rocks that have experienced only mild metamorphism. Metasedimentary rocks vary from quartzite through mica schist to marble, with one sequence of quartzite beds exceeding  in thickness. Metamorphic conditions reached 550±50°C and 2±1 kb pressure, corresponding to a low-pressure amphibolite facies.

Footnotes

Precambrian formations of New Mexico
Paleoproterozoic magmatism
Proterozoic North America